The Lebanon Junction Historic District, in Lebanon Junction, Kentucky, is a  historic district which was listed on the National Register of Historic Places in 2003.

The district included 135 contributing buildings, a contributing structure, and four contributing sites.  It is roughly bounded by Maple St., KY 61, Knoxville Ave. and Harrel and Masden Streets.

References

\

Historic districts on the National Register of Historic Places in Kentucky
Greek Revival architecture in Kentucky
Romanesque Revival architecture in Kentucky
Buildings and structures completed in 1890
National Register of Historic Places in Bullitt County, Kentucky